Bangkok Knockout is a 2010 Thai martial arts film.

Plot
After winning a contest to star in a Hollywood film, a group of martial arts students celebrate by hosting a party. However, they all get drugged and passed out while celebrating. When they wake up, they are attacked and soon some of their friends have been kidnapped. They quickly learn that a group of assassins are coming after them and that the contest may not have been what it seemed. The only way to survive is to fight their way out and rescue their friends.

Cast
Speedy Arnold as Mr. Snead
Pimchanok Luevisadpaibul as Bai-Fern
Gitabak Agohjit as Git
Supaksorn Chaimongkol as Joy
Sorapong Chatree as Sergeant Ram Former Border Patrol Police
Virat Kemgrad as Jao
Chatchapol Kulsiriwoottichai as Pod
Sarawoot Kumsorn as U-Go
Krittiya Lardphanna as Kuk Yai
Sumret Muengput as Ao
Deka Partum as	Jame
Panna Rittikrai as Suthep Sisai	
Puchong Sarthorn as Eddo	
Poonyapat Soonkunchanon as Lerm
Tanavit Wongsuwan as Pom
Vinai Weangyanogoong as Black Men

Production
Magnolia Pictures has gained the U.S. distributional rights.

Reception
The movie received mixed to positive reviews.

References

External links
  - US website
 

2010 martial arts films
2010 films
Thai-language films
Thai martial arts films
Sahamongkol Film International films
Muay Thai films
Thai Muay Thai films
Martial arts tournament films